St. Mary's High School is a co-educational school located in the Cantonment area in Belagavi, near the Head Post Office of Belagavi, India and is regulated and supervised by Karnataka Secondary Education Examination Board. It was founded in 1851 and is celebrating its 165th jubilee in 2016. Near by educational institutions are Islamiya College and B K Model High School.

History
St. Mary's High School was established in the year 1851 mainly for the children of the British soldiers with 4 pupils then, in 1947 for Anglo-Indians and in 1958 for purely Resident Indian. Late Guruprem D. David served as Principal for four decades. Philips Alvaris is presently working as Principal, succeeding  Jasmine Rubdi.

Satyajit Ray's Apu Trilogy featured in the Film Festival held on 15 August 1984 at St. Mary's High School, Belgaum.

Academic standing

School song
The school song is : 
   
Day by day, in high and low  
Forward we shall go
Forward like a streaming flow 
Hand in hand we go
Helping and upholding
Lowly, weak and poor
Whether be it day or night 
We shall do the right.

Chorus: Serving and rejoicing 
St. Marians' we go
God in man abiding
Before whom we bow
 
While in study or in play
Praying all the way
Watching, waiting in the way
Lest we go astray
We shall render honour
Glory every hour
This our school we love the most
With the pride we boast

Co curricular activities
Students participate in Karnataka Talent Search Examination,  
All India General Knowledge Test,  
Karnataka Red Cross Examination, 
Karnataka Drawing Lower and Higher Grade Examination,
Hindi ( हिंदी ) Examination I , II , III conducted by Hindi school of Bombay,
Kannada ( ಕನ್ನಡ ) : I , II , III by Vishwa Vidya Sadan Trust, Bangalore , 
Mathematics and Science by National Talent Search Examination, Delhi, 

ANNUAL ALL INDIA UN INFORMATION TEST and poetry.

The school also has The School Parliament , Literary Association , Children's Art , Photographic  , The Science and Nature Club respectively ; and an Interact Club under Rotary Club of Belgaum which is student organisation, where students take part as organisers of inter school events.

Students can also be member of National Cadet Corps (NCC).

Scholarships
Few scholarships provided are - Shri Deepak Santosh Sing Chandalia , Krisnarajira Javalkar , Yashwantrao N. H. Hangirrgekar , Hemandra Turakhia , Mrs. Manorama P. Shenoy and Shantappa Maroor ; 
and 
Late Dr. N. R. Kulkarni , Master Hemant M. Sanzgiri Memorial , Sub Krishnarao Balawant Sawalekar , Ajit Banahatti , Ramachnadra Chate , Smt. Manorma Pise , Tejas N. Shanbhag , Smt. Neelamma Mahadevappa Hugar , Rev A. V. Rubdi , Mr H. S. Johnson , Ms. S. A. Rubdi , Naveen Kamble , Sri Ajit Vamanrao Jadhav scholarships respectively.

School pledge
  
India is my country. All Indians are my brothers and sisters.
I love my country and I am proud of its rich and varied heritage.
I shall always strive to be worthy of it.
I shall give my parents , teachers and elders respect and treat everyone with courtesy.
To my country and my people I pledge my devotion.
In their well-being and prosperity alone lies my happiness.

House system
Students are divided into four Houses namely Yellow, Green, Blue, and Red. Each house colour is depicted on the student's uniform as a badge. They are led by four house leaders.

Passing Out parade
The SSLC students ( who will be completing grade 10 public examination commonly referred to as 'class 10 board examinations' ) march for the last time with lamps.

Sports
Annual intra house sports event are organised. Students also participate in events of Cricket, Table Tennis, Football with frequent participation in Royceton Memorial Trophy (under 14) which is organised by St. Paul's School , Belgaum , Swimming and Skating.

Notable alumni
 Late Amin Kittur, trekker, Best National Cadet Corps (NCC) Cadet - awarded by former prime minister Atal Bihari Vajpayee during Republic Day Parade at New Delhi.
 Ameet Joshi
 Dr. Ameet Patil
 Amankumar Paragi
 Shailesh Sharad Joshi, Amrut Pharmaceuticals
 Sanatkumar Kagwad
 Sourabh Potdar
 Sudharm Mudalgi
 Arun Agarwal
 Yash Kusane, swimmer
 Ashok Lohar

References

Schools in Belagavi district
Co-educational schools in India
Schools in Belgaum
High schools and secondary schools in Karnataka
Educational institutions established in 1851